Yossi Shekel (born September 24, 1984) is an Israeli footballer who plays for Maccabi Ironi Ashdod.

He previously played for FC Kairat, Hapoel Petah Tikva, Hapoel Nazareth Illit, Maccabi Herzliya, Hapoel Kfar Saba, Maccabi Be'er Sheva, Bnei Yehuda and Beitar Shimshon Tel Aviv. At international level, he played nine times for the Israeli under-21 team.

Career
In January 2019, Shekel joined Hapoel Azor.

References

1984 births
Living people
Israeli Jews
Israeli footballers
Association football goalkeepers
F.C. Ashdod players
Beitar Tel Aviv Bat Yam F.C. players
Bnei Yehuda Tel Aviv F.C. players
Maccabi Be'er Sheva F.C. players
Maccabi Herzliya F.C. players
Hapoel Nof HaGalil F.C. players
Hapoel Petah Tikva F.C. players
FC Kairat players
Maccabi Yavne F.C. players
Hapoel Rishon LeZion F.C. players
Hapoel Ashdod F.C. players
Maccabi Ironi Ashdod F.C. players
Israeli expatriate footballers
Expatriate footballers in Kazakhstan
Israeli expatriate sportspeople in Kazakhstan
Israeli Premier League players
Liga Leumit players
Israeli people of Iranian-Jewish descent
Footballers from Ashdod
Israel under-21 international footballers